Goniotorna erratica is a species of moth of the family Tortricidae. It is found in Madagascar.

The larvae feed on Bignonia vetusta and Lonicera and Ficus species.

References

Moths described in 1948
Goniotorna